This is a list of Brazilian television related events from 1991.

Events

Debuts

International
 Johnson and Friends (TV Cultura)

Television shows

1970s
Turma da Mônica (1976–present)

1980s
Xou da Xuxa (1986-1992)

Ending this year

Births
22 May - Sophia Abrahão, actress & singer

Deaths

See also
1991 in Brazil